Daniel Francois Haasbroek (born 26 August 1987) is a South African professional cricketer who has represented the Free State and North West provincial teams in first-class and List A cricket.

Haasbroek has also played club cricket in England; he assisted Northern in the Liverpool Premier League in 2006 and 2007, and joined Lancashire League team Lowerhouse as the club professional in 2011.

References

1987 births
Living people
South African cricketers
Free State cricketers
North West cricketers